Thurinjapuram block is a revenue block in the Tiruvannamalai district of Tamil Nadu, India. It contains a total of 47 panchayat villages.

References
 

Revenue blocks in Tiruvannamalai district